Tatyana Pyurova or Tatiana Piurowa (born ) was a  retired Kazakhstani female volleyball player. She was part of the Kazakhstan women's national volleyball team.

She competed with the national team at the 2008 Summer Olympics in Beijing,  China. 
She played with Zhetyssu in 2008.

Clubs
  Zhetyssu (2008)

See also
 Kazakhstan at the 2008 Summer Olympics

References

External links
Sports Reference
asianvolleyball.net
www.fivb.org
FIVB
Getty Images

1983 births
Living people
Kazakhstani women's volleyball players
Sportspeople from Tashkent
Volleyball players at the 2008 Summer Olympics
Olympic volleyball players of Kazakhstan